Shanghai University Business School is located in Shanghai University's Yanchang Campus.

The school is operated under the model of segregation of administration and leadership.  The board is mainly formed by the leaders of the Shanghai University, including Shanghai University's Vice-President as the Board's Chairman.

Shanghai University